Virginia's 11th congressional district election, 2010 was an election held to determine who would represent Virginia's 11th congressional district in the United States House of Representatives during the 112th Congress. The seat that was contested is located in Northern Virginia, and includes most of Fairfax County, all of the city of Fairfax, and part of eastern Prince William County. Democrat Gerry Connolly first won the seat in 2008. The Republican nominee was Keith Fimian.

The result was too close to call immediately following the election. At the end of the day on November 2, Connolly led Fimian by only 487 votes, with canvassing and certification still to be completed. After canvassing was completed and results from two outstanding precincts and provisional ballots were counted, Connolly increased his lead to 921 votes (0.41%). Although Virginia election law allows the losing candidate to request a recount on November 22 if the margin is less than 1%, the recount is at the government's expense if the margin is less than 0.5%, and the Fimian campaign had alluded to the possibility of a recount in a statement, Fimian eventually conceded the race to Connolly on November 9. Connolly won by 981 votes, or 0.43%.

Background

The 2010 race was a rematch of the 2008 race, when Connolly defeated Fimian 55% to 43%. Connolly was unopposed for the Democratic nomination.

Fimian faced a primary challenge from moderate Fairfax County Board of Supervisors member Pat Herrity. A bruising primary fight ensued and The Washington Post described the race as "one of the nastiest contests in the commonwealth," with each campaign accusing the other of negative campaigning. Fimian emerged victorious, beating Herrity 56%-44%, with 35,890 votes cast.

The race was closely watched; it was considered a bellwether battleground district in the larger Republican mission to regain a majority in the House. The National Republican Congressional Committee picked Fimian for its Young Guns candidate training and support program.

Polling

Fundraising

Candidates

Democratic nomination
Gerry Connolly, freshman incumbent (unopposed)

Republican nomination
Keith Fimian, businessman and 2008 Republican nominee
Pat Herrity, member of the Fairfax County Board of Supervisors

Results

Others on ballot
Libertarian David L. Dotson,
Independent Green David William Gillis, Jr.
Independent Christopher F. DeCarlo.

General election results

See also
United States House of Representatives elections in Virginia, 2010#District 11

References

External links
VA 11 a Toss Up from Real Clear Politics
Race ranking and details from CQ Politics
Campaign contributions from OpenSecrets
Official campaign sites
Gerry Connolly for Congress
Keith Fimian for Congress
Pat Herrity for Congress

2010 Virginia elections